Octavio Betancourt Arango (January 4, 1928 – June 18, 2017) was the Colombian Catholic prelate. He served as an auxiliary bishop of the Roman Catholic Archdiocese of Medellín from November 23, 1970, until November 10, 1975, and a bishop of the Roman Catholic Diocese of Garzón from November 10, 1975, until April 26, 1977.

Life
He was born on January 4, 1928, in the municipality of Abejorral, Antioquia, his parents were Vicente Betancourt and María Arango. He studied at the Universidad Pontificia Bolivariana until he obtained a bachelor's degree in 1945. In 1946 he entered the Medellín Major Seminary and after he was ordained a priest by Monsignor Joaquín García Benítez on 1 November 1951.

He was cooperating vicar in Caldas and Titiribí. In August 1953 traveled to Rome to study and obtained the degree of Canon Law in the Pontifical Lateran University. He returned to Colombia in late 1956. He was Vice-Chancellor, professor of the Seminary, chaplain of the Servants of the Blessed Sacrament and Chancellor.

In November 1962 he was appointed secretary of the Colombian Episcopate in Bogota, where he returned in July 1966. He was then designated as the spiritual father of the seminary. In May 1968 was appointed Chancellor and in September 1969 Vicar General.

On November 23, 1970, he was appointed titular bishop of Germania in Dacia and an auxiliary bishop of the Roman Catholic Archdiocese of Medellín. He received the episcopal consecration on February 2, 1971, from the hands of Monsignor Tulio Botero Salazar in the Metropolitan Cathedral of Medellín.

On November 10, 1975, he was appointed Bishop of the Roman Catholic Diocese of Garzón, where he remained until April 1977 when he resigned for health reasons. Since July 1977 he has been linked to the Regional Ecclesiastical Court of Medellin.

Notes

1928 births
2017 deaths
People from Antioquia Department
20th-century Roman Catholic bishops in Colombia
Colombian expatriates in Italy
Roman Catholic bishops of Garzón
Roman Catholic bishops of Medellín